Nudhaashe Dhookohfaa Loabivaa is a 2007 Maldivian short-film directed by Mohamed Shamaail. Produced by Aishath Shadhin Shamaail under Stepin Productions, the film stars Mariyam Afeefa and Lufshan Shakeeb in pivotal roles.

Premise
Shabana (Mariyam Afeefa) and Hafiz (Lufshan Shakeeb) are college mates whose relationship is misunderstood by the former's aunt, Rasheedha (Aminath Shareef) who warns Hafiz to stay away from Shabana. Hafiz determines to challenge Rasheedha and wins Shabana's love where Rasheedha negotiates to arrange Shabana's marriage with a wealthy businessman, Thuhthu (Hamid Ali). Rasheedha fakes an illness and emotionally blackmails Shabana into marrying Thuhthu, which she rejects on the spot. However things take an unexpected turn when Shabana receives the news of Hafiz's untimely death in a road accident.

Cast 
 Mariyam Afeefa as Shabana
 Lufshan Shakeeb as Hafiz
 Hamid Ali as Thuhthu
 Mohamed Afrah as Ali
 Aminath Shareef as Rasheedha
 Ahmed Ziya as Hussain

Soundtrack

References

Maldivian short films
2007 short films
2007 films